Ligi Ndogo Sports Club is a professional association football club based in Nairobi, Kenya. It began as a youth academy (which still exists today) on 1 January 2002, with the senior team formed in 2005.

The club currently has no major honours, but have competed in the Kenyan Nationwide League, FKF Division One and the Kenyan National Super League. The table details the club's achievements in major competitions, and the top scorers for each documented season. Records of minor competitions such as the Jamhuri Day Cup and the Madaraka Day Cup are not included.

Key

 Pld = Played
 W = Games won
 D = Games drawn
 L = Games lost
 GF = Goals for
 GA = Goals against
 GD = Goal difference
 Pts = Points
 Pos = Final position

 Div. = Division
 Comp. = Competition
 KPL = Premier League
 NSL = National Super League
 Div 1 = Division One
 NWL = Nationwide League
 Cup = FKF President's Cup
 T8 = Top 8 Cup
 Super = Super Cup

 Italics = Ongoing season/competition
 R1 = Round 1
 R2 = Round 2
 R3 = Round 3
 R32 = Round of 32
 R16 = Round of 16
 QF = Quarter-finals
 SF = Semi-finals
 F = Final

Seasons

Footnotes
 Competed in the KFF division of the league.
 Competed in Group 1 (Zone A) of the league.

References